Kate Lamb (born 18 January 1988) is a Welsh actress best known for playing Nurse Delia Busby in the BBC drama series Call the Midwife from 2015 to 2017.

Early life 
Lamb was born in Cardiff, Wales, United Kingdom
 Lamb grew up in Tenby, Pembrokeshire where she attended Greenhill School. Lamb's first acting role was at the age of four, in a Tenby production of Toad of Toad Hall.

Education 
Lamb attended the United World College in Swaziland before returning to the UK to study for a degree in English and Drama at Bristol University. She also trained at the London Academy of Music and Dramatic Art (LAMDA).

Career 
Lamb successfully auditioned for her role in Call the Midwife and, when asked to give herself a regional identity, decided to play nurse Delia Busby with a Pembrokeshire accent. Lamb's character has a lesbian relationship with Nurse Patsy (Emerald Fennell). After her character was knocked off her bicycle and left with an uncertain future at the end of her first series, she returned to the role in December 2015. In May 2017, however, it was announced that Lamb wouldn't return for the seventh series.

Filmography

Film

Television

Theatre

References

External links
 

Living people
1988 births
Welsh television actresses
Actresses from Cardiff
People from Tenby
Alumni of the University of Bristol
Alumni of the London Academy of Music and Dramatic Art
People educated at a United World College